Elections to Greenwich Council were held on 4 May 2006.  The whole council was up for election for the first time since the 2002 election.

Greenwich local elections are held every four years, with the next due in 2010.

Election result

|}

Ward results

Abbey Wood

Blackheath Westcombe

Charlton

Coldharbour and New Eltham

Eltham North

Eltham South

Eltham West

Glyndon

Greenwich West

Kidbrooke with Hornfair

Middle Park and Sutcliffe

Peninsula

Plumstead

Shooters Hill

Thamesmead Moorings

Woolwich Common

Woolwich Riverside

References

2006
2006 London Borough council elections
May 2006 events in the United Kingdom